The wonderful bird-of-paradise, also known as Reichenow's riflebird, is a bird in the family Paradisaeidae that is an intergeneric hybrid between a twelve-wired bird-of-paradise and lesser bird-of-paradise.

History
Five adult male specimens are known of this hybrid, held in the American Museum of Natural History and the Berlin Natural History Museum and coming from Sorong in the Vogelkop Peninsula of north-western New Guinea, Madang on the north-eastern coast of New Guinea, as well as other unknown localities.

Notes

References
 
 

Hybrid birds of paradise
Birds of New Guinea
Intergeneric hybrids